Oneiric Diary is the third extended play by South Korean–Japanese girl group Iz*One. It was released on June 15, 2020, by Off the Record Entertainment. The album is available in three versions: Diary, Oneiric and 3D, and consists of eight tracks including the lead single, "Secret Story of the Swan".

Background
On May 12, it was announced that they would be having a summer comeback and would be releasing the 3rd season of their reality show Iz*One Chu. On May 19, it was confirmed that the group would release their third mini-album Oneiric Diary on June 15. On June 15, the company announced that the music video release will be postponed to June 16, while the performance video and album will be released on the original schedule given. The group held the comeback showcase for their album on Mnet's second channel M2.

Commercial performance
On June 22, it was reported that the album broke the record of first week sales on Hanteo among girl groups, with 389,334 copies sold on its first 7 days.

Track listing

Notes

Charts

Certifications and sales

See also
 List of certified albums in South Korea

Release history

References

Iz*One albums
2020 EPs
Korean-language EPs